Hotel power may refer to:

 Head-end power
 Hotel electric power